Salem Creek (also known as Stone Church Hollow Creek, Seyberts Creek, or Varners Creek) is a tributary of the Susquehanna River in Luzerne County, Pennsylvania, in the United States. It has no named tributaries, but one unnamed tributary. Lee Mountain and Summer Hill are both in the vicinity of the creek. It flows through a gorge at one point. The creek is in the ridge and valley region and is near the southern terminus of the Wisconsinan glaciation. It served as a sluiceway for glacial meltwater during the aforementioned glacial period. The creek's discharge is considerably lower than it was during the previous glaciation. Rock formations such as the Catskill Formation and the Trimmers Rock Formation occur near it, as does glacial till.

The dam experienced a failure in the 1950s. A weir is also present on the creek. One bridge crossing the creek is scheduled for replacement and/or rehabilitation. Swampland occurs at its headwaters. The entire drainage basin is designated as a Coldwater Fishery and a Migratory Fishery. The creek is inhabited by trout.

Course

Salem Creek begins on the southern edge of Lee Mountain in Salem Township. It flows west for a short distance before entering a valley and turning southwest. After several tenths of a mile, the creek turns south for some distance. It briefly turns southeast before turning south again for a few miles, receiving an unnamed tributary from the right. The creek's valley becomes much shallower and nearly disappears as the creek turns south-southeast for several tenths of a mile. It then turns south and enters a valley known as Sybert Hollow for a few tenths of a mile. On the southern side of the hollow, the creek crosses US Route 11 and reaches its confluence with the Susquehanna River a short distance downstream, near the border between Salem Township and Nescopeck Township.

Salem Creek joins the Susquehanna River  upriver of its mouth.

Tributaries
Salem Creek has no named tributaries. However, it does have one unnamed tributary.

Hydrology
The average daily discharge of Salem Creek is estimated to be 3.95 cubic feet per second. At the mouth of the creek, its peak annual discharge has a 10 percent chance of reaching 640 cubic feet per second. Its peak annual discharge has a 2 percent change of reaching 1480 cubic feet per second and a 1 percent chance of reaching 2010 cubic feet per second. The peak annual discharge of the creek has a 0.2 percent chance of reaching 4300 cubic feet per second.

The discharge of Salem Creek is much lower than it was during previous glaciation periods. However, it is still capable of causing destructive floods during times of sustained runoff.

Geography

The headwaters of Salem Creek are on the southern side of Lee Mountain. In its middle reaches, it passes through the escarpment of Summer Hill. North of that hill, the creek's valley is deeply incised. Just upstream of Summer Hill, it passes through a rocky gorge with potholes and plunge pools. The gorge is relatively deep. Additionally, the creek descends through Sybert Hollow in its last  to reach the elevation of the Susquehanna River.

A dam and a weir made of concrete are situated on Salem Creek. There is a natural amphitheater on the creek as well.

Geology
Salem Creek is in the ridge and valley physiographical province. The creek is a freestone stream. A total of 31 percent of that stretch consists of runs and the remaining 13 percent consists of pools. During the late Wisconsinan glaciation, Salem Creek, as well as several other streams in the area, served as a sluiceway for glacial meltwater.

These signs of glacial meltwater erosion are a series of potholes or plunge pools in the creek's valley. The potholes are in sandstone and siltstone of the Trimmers Rock Formation. The potholes were later breached due to downcutting.

The gorge that Salem Creek flows through is lined with resistant rocks of the Catskill Formation and the Trimmers Rock Formation. A boulder-rich glacial till occurs to the east of the creek. Additionally, there is a large and pitted field of kame in the vicinity of its headwaters.

Watershed
The creek is entirely within the United States Geological Survey quadrangle of Berwick. The creek is  downriver of the village of Beach Haven on the Susquehanna River.

The headwaters of Salem Creek are on badly drained and swampy land. The former headwaters currently are part of the watershed of a shorter stream that flows eastward to the Susquehanna River.

History and name
Salem Creek was entered into the Geographic Names Information System on August 2, 1979. Its identifier in the Geographic Names Information System is 1186856. The stream is also known as Stone Church Hollow Creek. This name is typically used on county highway maps. Other names for it include Seyberts Creek and Varners Creek.

The Berwick Water Company (now known as the Keystone Water Company) once constructed a dam on Salem Creek upstream of  Summer Hill. In mid-October 1954, a rainstorm caused by Hurricane Hazel caused the creek to breach the dam, which failed as a result.

An electrofishing survey was carried out on Salem Creek on September 7, 1994.

A bridge carrying State Route 4037 crosses Salem Creek. As of 2014, there are plans to replace and/or rehabilitate the bridge.

Biology
The entire drainage basin of Salem Creek is designated as a Coldwater Fishery and a Migratory Fishery. Wild trout naturally reproduce in it between its headwaters and its mouth. Both brook and brown trout inhabit the creek. However, brook trout are more common. The typical substrate for trout spawn in the creek is gravel.

See also
Nescopeck Creek, next tributary of the Susquehanna River going downriver
Walker Run, next tributary of the Susquehanna River going upriver
List of rivers of Pennsylvania

References

Rivers of Luzerne County, Pennsylvania
Tributaries of the Susquehanna River
Rivers of Pennsylvania